The Heart (心) is one of the zàng organs stipulated by Traditional Chinese Medicine (TCM). It is a functionally defined entity and not equivalent to the anatomical organ of the same name.

In the context of the zang-fu concept
As a zàng, the Heart is considered to be a yin organ. Its associated yang organ is the Small Intestine. Both Heart and Small Intestine are attributed to the Fire element.

Regarding its stipulated functions, the Heart
‘’stores‘’ (藏) the shén (神, ‘’Aggregate Soul‘’, usually translated as mind)
governs xuě (blood) and vessels/meridians
opens into the tongue
reflects in facial complexion
governs joy (喜)

The Heart's function is said to be strongest between 11am and 1pm. Disturbed function of the Heart typically presents as palpitations, arrhythmia, insomnia, dream disturbed sleep, poor memory, restlessness, or even delirium.

Notes

References
中医世家 (2006-07-18), "第一节 五脏", 中医基础理论, retrieved 2010-12-18
Cultural China (2007), "Chinese Medicine : Basic Zang Fu Theory", Kaleidoscope → Health, retrieved 2010-12-21

Further reading 
 
 

Traditional medicine
Traditional Chinese medicine